Charles Christopher Eberhardt (July 27, 1871 – February 22, 1965) was an American diplomat who served as ambassador to Costa Rica.

Biography

Charles Christopher Eberhardt was an American diplomat who was born in Salina, Kansas, on July 27, 1871. Eberhardt was educated in the local public schools before going to Wesleyan University. Eberhardt was a Republican with varied business interests, including lumber, insurance and oil, prior to serving in the diplomatic corps. He died February 22, 1965, in Fort Smith, Arkansas, and is buried in Gypsum Hill Cemetery in Salina, Kansas.

Diplomatic career 
Eberhardt's most senior positions were between 1925 and 1933. During his early diplomatic career Eberhardt had served as a chargé d'affaires at various postings before he was promoted to minister to Nicaragua March 12, 1925. He left this post on May 10, 1929.

Following this, Eberhardt then went on to become the minister to Costa Rica on January 9, 1930 where he remained until September 24, 1933.

Earlier positions included:
 Clerk in the American Embassy in Mexico City, 1903
 U.S. Vice & Deputy Consul General in Mexico City, 1904-06
 U.S. Consul in Iquitos, 1906-08
 U.S. Consul in Barranquilla, 1908-10
 U.S. Consul General at Large, 1910–18, 1919-24
 was assigned as U.S. Consul General in Rio de Janeiro 1918-19, though he did not go
 U.S. Consul General at Large for Eastern Europe 1919
 U.S. Consul General for Eastern Europe 1922-25

References

Further reading
 Douglass, Paul 1939. The Story of German Methodism: Biography of an Immigrant Soul, page 268
 The Biographic Register 1957. U.S. Department of State, Foreign Affairs Document and Reference Center, Publishing and Reproduction Division, page 729
 U.S. Pan American Society 1930 page 66

1871 births
1965 deaths
Ambassadors of the United States to Nicaragua
Ambassadors of the United States to Costa Rica
People from Salina, Kansas
Kansas Republicans
Wesleyan University alumni